Aphomia lolotialis is a species of snout moth in the genus Aphomia. It was described by Aristide Caradja in 1927 and is known from China.

References

Moths described in 1927
Tirathabini
Moths of Asia
Taxa named by Aristide Caradja